John Moyer (born May 1, 1969 in Camden, New Jersey) is an American stand-up comedian, screenwriter, actor and film producer. Moyer co-wrote the screenplays for The Singles Ward, The R.M., and The Home Teachers. He also wrote, produced, directed, and acted in Mobsters and Mormons.

Screenwriting
The Singles Ward (2002)
The R.M. (2003)
The Home Teachers (2004)
Mobsters and Mormons (2005)
Single Second Ward (2007)
Disjointed Custody (2012)

Acting
The R.M. - Would-be Home Teacher (2003)
The Home Teachers - President Mason (2004)
Mobsters and Mormons - Agent Tuttle (2005)

Directing
Mobsters and Mormons

Career
In 1991, while attending Brigham Young University to study Theater and Film, John Moyer first attempted stand-up comedy when he went to an open mic night at comedy club in Provo, Utah and decided to get on stage. After graduating from college in 1994, Moyer began to pursue a career as a stand-up comedian. Speaking of the experience, Moyer said in an interview:

Years later, after experiencing his first divorce, Moyer wrote a screenplay based on his own life experiences of being a divorced Mormon trying to make it as a stand-up comedian. He named the script The Singles Ward.

Eventually, Moyer showed the script to Kurt Hale, grandson of Ruth Hale (founder of the Hale Center Theater, a popular Utah Valley community theater). Hale and partner Dave Hunter decided to make the script into low-budget comedy aimed at members of the LDS Church. Hale re-wrote the script and directed the movie. Eventually, Hale and Hunter founded a company called Halestorm Entertainment to distribute the movie in 2002. Although panned by critics, The Singles Ward was a popular novelty for Mormon audiences, grossing $1,250,798 at theaters in Utah and other areas with heavy Mormon populations.

Upon the financial success of The Singles Ward, Hale quickly got to work on his second LDS comedy movie, The R.M. Once again, Hale directed from a script co-written by Hale and Moyer, and Hale cast many of the same actors from his first movie. The R.M. was released by Halestorm Entertainment in 2003. Although the box office returns were almost as strong as The Singles Ward ($1,111,615), audience feedback was not as favorable.

In 2003, Halestorm Entertainment released The Home Teachers, the third LDS comedy by Kurt Hale. Like before, the movie was from a script co-written by Hale and Moyer. The Home Teachers was a critical and box office disappointment. Critics lambasted its use of slapstick humor and criticized what they perceived as a heavy-handed plot. The film also suffered from direct comparisons to Tommy Boy, a popular 1995 film starring Chris Farley, and David Spade, and Planes, Trains & Automobiles, a 1987 film directed by John Hughes. Many critics felt that The Home Teachers borrowed too much from these films, a concern one professional critic referred to as "verging on comedic plagiarism". The movie grossed $203,917 during its theatrical run, less than 17% the gross of The Singles Ward.

After The Home Teachers, Moyer departed from Hale and to make his own LDS movie, Mobsters and Mormons. Halestorm Entertainment released Mobsters and Mormons in 2005. The movie grossed $409,604 in total box office revenues, approximately 33% the gross of The Singles Ward.

Moyer has not directed another feature film.

In 2007, Halestorm Entertainment released The Singles 2nd Ward, a straight-to-DVD sequel to the 2002 movie, co-written by Hale and Moyer.

In 2011, Moyer produced The Real Life Singles Ward, a straight-to-DVD video documentary about LDS dating, produced on a budget of $3,100.

In 2012, Moyer wrote and acted in Disjointed Custody, a four-minute movie directed by Christian Serge that was posted on YouTube. Moyer wrote the short script based on observations made during his own divorces.

  
In 2012, John Moyer became a comedy hypnotist.

Personal life 
In 2016, Moyer married Rachelle Joseph, Mrs. Utah 2003 and 1st Runner Up Mrs. America 2003.

References

External links
Seattle Times Review of The Singles Ward
Seattle Post Intelligencer Review of The Singles Ward
Box Office Magazine Review of Mobsters and Mormons
Moyer's official website
 

American male actors
1969 births
American male comedians
21st-century American comedians
Brigham Young University alumni
Latter Day Saints from New Jersey
American male screenwriters
Living people
Actors from Camden, New Jersey
Writers from Camden, New Jersey
Film directors from New Jersey